Changa is a genus of cicadas in the family Cicadidae. There are at least two described species in Changa.

Species
These two species belong to the genus Changa:
 Changa jsguillotsi (Boulard, 2005) c g
 Changa sita (Distant, 1881) c g
Data sources: i = ITIS, c = Catalogue of Life, g = GBIF, b = Bugguide.net

References

Further reading

 
 
 
 

Dundubiini
Cicadidae genera